Zlatko Topčić (born 30 April 1955) is a Bosnian screenwriter, playwright and novelist. He has written a number of films, including: Remake, The Abandoned, Miracle in Bosnia; theater plays: Time Out, I Don't Like Mondays, Refugees; novels: The Final Word, Dagmar, June 28, 1914. 

Topčić's works have been translated into twelve languages: English, German, French, Italian, Czech, Turkish, Polish, Swedish, Slovenian, Bulgarian, Macedonian, Albanian, and included in several domestic and international anthologies.

He is a member of the Association of Writers of Bosnia and Herzegovina, PEN Center of Bosnia and Herzegovina, Association of Filmmakers in Bosnia and Herzegovina, International Screenwriters Association, American Screenwriters Association, Concordia Organization and the Royal Institute of International Affairs (Chatham House).

In 2004, he was included on the annual Marquis Who's Who in the World list of the 100 most influential people in the world.

Early life and family 
Topčić was born in Sarajevo on 30 April 1955. His father, Zaim Topčić (1920–1990), was also a writer. His mother, Naila (1925–2002), was a member of the Selimić family; her grandfather was Zaim-beg Selimić, a municipal councilor, landowner, benefactor and philanthropist, who was the owner of the Kravica waterfall.

He graduated from the Law School of the University of Sarajevo. At the age of 17 and under the pseudonym Gold Taucher, Topčić began writing crime novels and short stories, selling millions of copies.

Career

Theatrical work 
Topčić has produced over forty plays, including The Frog, which was adapted into a film in 2017, and Helver's Night, internationally most awarded play in the history of Bosnian theater. He is the only author who thrice won the BZK Preporod Award for best dramatic text, for dramas Bare Skin (2006), Krokodil Lacoste / Silvertown (2010) and Nobody's and Everyone's (2017).

Topčić's plays, which have been staged in Bosnian and international theaters, include Collapse (1986), Musa and the Goat (1993), Kulin Ban (1995), Refugees (1999), Plaza Hotel (2000), Time Out (2002), comedy Head-On (2004), monodrama Pardon Asks Radivoje, Radivoje's Son (2006), Happy New 1994! (2006), Bare Skin (2007), I Don't Like Mondays (2009; directed by Christian Papke), Krokodil Lacoste / Silvertown (2011) and Puzzle Opera (2020). I Don't Like Mondays (2009) won the prestigious PEN Austrian Center Award. In 2010 the drama was published in German by Der Österreichische PEN-Club, Vienna, and was printed in over eleven thousand copies.

His play Time Out (2002; directed by James P. Mirrione) had its English premiere in London at the Gate Theatre and toured to the Riverside Studios, the West Yorkshire Playhouse in Leeds, the Royal Armouries Museum, Powerhouse 1, and Bretton Hall. Also, it was performed in the United States (New York City), Austria (Vienna) and Poland (Warsaw).

Screenplays 
Topčić wrote the screenplays for four documentary films: The Best Years Ever (1994), Miracle in Bosnia (1995), I Respond to You, God (1996) and Blood and Musk (1997). He also wrote the screenplays  for Remake (2003) and The Abandoned (2010). His script for Remake (published like a book in 2002) was awarded at the competition of the Ministry of Culture and won the Association of Filmmakers in Bosnia and Herzegovina Award for best original screenplay (1999). His script for The Abandoned (working title: Bare Skin) was a winning (91 participants) at the first edition of CineLink, held as part of the 9th Sarajevo Film Festival (2003) and won the Best Screenplay Award at the 2011 Hollywood Film Festival.

His films have been screened at numerous international film festivals, including: Cannes Film Festival, Venice Film Festival, Berlin International Film Festival, International Film Festival Rotterdam, Karlovy Vary International Film Festival, Toronto International Film Festival, Locarno Festival, New York Film Festival, Los Angeles Film Festival, Hollywood Film Festival, International Documentary Film Festival Amsterdam, and many other.

Fiction 
He has published a collections of stories: The Vital Question (1981), Fantastic Stories (1989), Ptica iz drugog jata / A Bird From Another Flock (bilingual edition; 1995), Bogomil Legends (1997) and Selected Stories (2000); such a novels as A Man From Nowhere (1986), Kulin (1994), Nightmare (1997), Bare Skin (2004), Safet Sušić (2007), The Final Word (2011), Dagmar (2013), zavrsna.rijec@dagmar (2017), Overture (2018) and June 28, 1914 (2019, 2021).  

In 1998 he won the prestigious Annual Award of the Association of Writers of Bosnia and Herzegovina for his novel Nightmare (1997), which was translated into Turkish (Saray Bosna da kabus, Gendas, Istanbul, 1998) and Slovenian (Mora, Založba Goga, Novo Mesto, 2003). In 2014 he won the same award for novel Dagmar (2013) and became one of the few writers who have twice won this award (his father Zaim Topčić was also a double winner).

Topčić's novel The Final Word (2011) received the Hasan Kaimija Award for best book published in 2011 and 2012, and the Skender Kulenović Award for best book published in 2011. It was translated into French (Le mot de la fin, M.E.O. Edition, Brussels, 2016) and was ranked first on several bestseller lists.

Dagmar, his 2013 novel, won the Fra Grgo Martić Award for best book of fiction published in 2013. It was translated into Czech (For Prague, Prague, 2017).

Other work 
Topčić was a board member of the Open Society Foundation Bosnia and Herzegovina - Soros Foundation, worked on several UNESCO projects and is the founder of the Bosnian Tombstone Award and Nedžad Ibrišimović Award. He is one of the founders of the Association of Writers of Bosnia and Herzegovina, from 1993 to 2001 the first Secretary General and from 2006 to 2010 a board member. From 2001 to 2011 he was director and artistic director of the Chamber Theater 55.

He was selector of the International Theatre Festival MESS, president and member of several juries, among others, Foundation for Cinematography jury member for film projects financing. From 2013 to 2016 he was general director of TVSA. In 2016 he became director of the Library of Sarajevo. Topčić was a member of the Commission for Free Artists of Bosnia and Herzegovina, president of Arts Council of the Sarajevo National Theatre from 2015 to 2019 and a member of Council of the BHRT Governing Board from 2019 to 2021.

Personal life 
Topčić spent the entirety of the Bosnian War in Sarajevo. He was trapped in Grbavica (quarter of the city of Sarajevo) in 1993. Fifty years earlier (1943) his father Zaim Topčić (1920–1990) was trapped in the Jasenovac concentration camp during World War II, as a communist. About these events, he wrote the screenplay for Remake.

He lives in Sarajevo with his wife Amela and his son Kerim.

Quotes 
"War is a war. Everywhere is hard and bloody, but the Balkans in it bring their coloring and passion. Someone happened to be on the right side. But, madam, be without worry: it is not so far a day when both sides will become the same and when it will not be known which side of the story is right."
—In novel A Man From Nowhere, 1986

Filmography

Theater plays 
 Collapse, 1986
 Musa and the Goat, 1993
 Kulin Ban, 1995
 Refugees, 1999
 Plaza Hotel, 2000
 Time Out, 2002
 Head-On, 2004
 Pardon Asks Radivoje, Radivoje's Son, 2006
 Happy New 1994!, 2006
 I Don't Like Mondays, 2009
 Krokodil Lacoste / Silvertown, 2011
 Puzzle Opera, 2020

Radio dramas 
 Happy New Year's Eve, 1977
 Interview, 1978
 Emergency Situation, 1987
 Walk on the Tips of Your Fingers, 1988
 Cesare Lombroso, 1989
 Kulin, 1990
 Lister's Machine, 1991
 Musa and the Goat, 1992
 Stanislavski Would Be Pleased, 2007

Bibliography

Collections of stories 
The Vital Question, 1981
Fantastic Stories, 1989
Ptica iz drugog jata / A Bird From Another Flock, 1995
Bogomil Legends, 1997
Selected Stories, 2000

Novels 
A Man From Nowhere, 1986
Kulin, 1994
Nightmare, 1997, 1998, 2000, 2004
Bare Skin, 2004
Safet Sušić, 2007
The Final Word, 2011
Dagmar, 2013
zavrsna.rijec@dagmar, 2017
Overture, 2018
June 28, 1914, 2019, 2021

Books of dramas 
Collapse, 1988
Plays, 1995
Refugees, 1999
Time Out, 2001
Eight Pieces, 2005
Bare Skin, 2007
I Don't Like Mondays, 2010
Krokodil Lacoste / Silvertown, 2016
Angry Men, 2016
Nobody's and Everyone's, 2019

Awards 
The Award at an anonymous competition of Radio Sarajevo for radio drama Interview, 1978
The Award at an anonymous competition of Radio Sarajevo for radio drama Emergency Situation, 1987
The Annual Award of the Association of Writers of Bosnia and Herzegovina for best book published in 1997 for novel Nightmare, 1998
The Association of Filmmakers in Bosnia and Herzegovina Award for screenplay A Man From Nowhere (Remake), 1999
The Award of the Ministry of Culture for screenplay Remake, 1999
The Award of the Ministry of Culture for drama Time Out, 2000
The CineLink Award (Sarajevo Film Festival) for screenplay Bare Skin (The Abandoned), 2003
The Award of magazine TmačaArt for best drama Head-On, 2004
The Award of magazine TmačaArt for best drama Happy New 1994!, 2004
The Award for best dramatic text at the Festival of Bosnian-Herzegovinian Theaters for drama Head-On, 2004
The BZK Preporod Award for best dramatic text Bare Skin, 2006
The Award at an anonymous competition of Radio Sarajevo for radio drama Stanislavski Would Be Pleased, 2007
The Award for best contemporary text at the Theatre Games for drama Happy New 1994!, 2007
The PEN Austrian Center Award for drama I Don't Like Mondays, 2009
The BZK Preporod Award for best dramatic text Krokodil Lacoste / Silvertown, 2010
The Award for best contemporary text at the Theatre Games for drama Krokodil Lacoste / Silvertown, 2011
The Best Screenplay Award at the Transilvania International Film Festival for The Abandoned, 2011
The Best Screenplay Award at the Golden Carpathian Film Festival for The Abandoned, 2011
The Best Screenplay Award at the Hollywood Film Festival for The Abandoned, 2011
The Skender Kulenović Award for best book published in 2011 for novel The Final Word, 2012
The Hasan Kaimija Award for best book published in 2011 and 2012 for novel The Final Word, 2012
The Fra Grgo Martić Award for best book of fiction published in 2013 for novel Dagmar, 2013
The Annual Award of the Association of Writers of Bosnia and Herzegovina for best book published in 2013 for novel Dagmar, 2014
The BZK Preporod Award for best dramatic text Nobody's and Everyone's, 2017
The Award of the Publishing Foundation for best book for novel June 28, 1914, 2021
The 25 November Award for the book of the year for novel June 28, 1914, 2022

See also 
List of Bosnian and Herzegovinian people
List of Bosniak writers
List of Sarajevans
List of Bosniaks

References

External links 

1955 births
Living people
Bosniaks of Bosnia and Herzegovina
Writers from Sarajevo
University of Sarajevo alumni
Bosniak writers
Bosnia and Herzegovina screenwriters
Male screenwriters
Bosnia and Herzegovina dramatists and playwrights
Bosnia and Herzegovina novelists
Bosnia and Herzegovina short story writers
20th-century novelists
21st-century novelists
Bosnia and Herzegovina male writers